The grammar of the West Frisian language, a West Germanic language spoken mostly in the province of Friesland (Fryslân) in the north of the Netherlands, is similar to other West Germanic languages, most notably Dutch. West Frisian is more analytic than its ancestor language Old Frisian, largely abandoning the latter's case system. It features two genders and inflects nouns in the singular and plural numbers.

Verbs inflect for person, number, mood, and tense, though many forms are formed using periphrastic constructions. There are two conjugations of weak verbs, in addition to strong and irregular verbs.

Nouns

Gender
In West Frisian there are two grammatical genders for nouns: the common gender (de-words), and the neuter gender (it-words). All plural nouns and common singular nouns take the definite article de, while singular neuter nouns take the definite article it. Regardless of gender, all nouns take the indefinite article in.

Number
West Frisian nouns inflect for two numbers: singular and plural. There are two productive suffixes used to form the plural: "-(e)n" and "-s". The suffix "-(e)n" is used for nouns in which the final syllable is stressed. The suffix "-s" is appended to plural nouns that end (in the singular) with unstressed syllables "-el", "-em", "-en", "-er", "-ert", "-ier", "-mer", "-ter", "-ster", "-sje". It also appears after the diminutive suffixes "-je", "-ke", and "-tsje", or as "-'s" at the end of many borrowed words.

 wurd "word" → wurden
 boarne "source" → boarnen
 doar "door" → doarren
 see "sea" → seeën
 hoekje "little hook" → hoekjes
 skrapke "comma" → skrapkes
 provinsje "province" → provinsjes
 tv "TV" → tv's

In rare cases, usually with nouns that generally come in pairs, a "double plural" is used, where both suffixes appear.

 reed "skate" → redens
 lears "boot" → learzens

A few nouns have irregular plural forms:

 bern "child" → bern
 skiep "sheep" → skiep
 ko "cow" → kij
 skoech "shoe" → skuon
 beest "beast" → bisten
 dei "day" → dagen
 wei "way" → wegen
 lid "member" → leden
 âlder "parent, elder" → âlden
 man "man" → mânlju
 frou "woman" → froulju

Diminutive
In West Frisian, there are three productive diminutive suffixes: "-je", "-ke", and "-tsje". The first of these three is used with nouns that end with the sounds /x/, /ɣ/, /k/ and /ŋ/, "-tsje" with nouns that end with /d/, /l/, /n/ and /t/, and "-ke" with all other sounds.

  "piece" → 
  "ash (tree)" → 
  "pile" → 
  "deer" → 
  "egg" → 
  "horse" → 

All nouns that are derived as diminutives are neuter and take the ending "-s" when pluralizing.

Case
Old Frisian's system of four grammatical cases (nominative, genitive, dative and accusative) has not survived in modern West Frisian. The only remainder of the old declension system is the genitive case suffix "-s", which is used to denote possession.

The genitive form may be "-(e)" or "-(e)s".

The ending "-(e)" ("-e" or zero) is used with monosyllabic nouns ending with a consonant or the vowel "-e". Also, it may be used with kinship terms and some plural nouns, mostly in idiomatic, fixed expressions: Ruerde mêm "Ruerd's mom", memme mûs "mom's mouse", fammene pronkjen "the girls' talk".

In most other cases, the "-(e)s" ending is used: har mans bern "her man's child(ren)", Fryslâns wâlden "Friesland's forests".

In the spoken language, genitive forms are rare and are normally replaced by analytical constructions with the preposition "fan (of)" or a possessive pronoun: de heit fan Anneke "Anneke's father", Anneke har heit (-//-, lit. "Anneke her father").

Adjectives

Inflected forms
Adjectives in West Frisian have a "base" and "inflected" form. The inflected form consists of the base form of the adjective and the suffix "-e". Adjectives are inflected when they are used in pronominal position before a definitely articulated neuter noun, any plural noun, or any common noun.

De wite kat "the white cat" (common, singular, definite)

It lytse famke "the little girl" (neuter, singular, definite)

In lyts famke "a little girl" (neuter, singular, indefinite)

Comparative and superlative
There are three degrees of adjectives: positive, comparative, and superlative. The positive is the base form of the adjective, the comparative degree is formed with the suffix "-er", and the superlative degree is formed with the suffix "-ste" and the definite article. If the base form of the adjective ends in /r/ or sometimes /l/ or /n/, then there is an obligatory /d/ inserted before the comparative suffix "-er". Thus, the degrees for the adjective fyn "fine" look as such:

The comparative and superlative forms can also be formed with the words mear and meast, though this is far rarer than in English and usually only occurs in adjectives that would be hard to pronounce if formed regularly or already end in "-er" or "-st". Also rarely, an even higher superlative degree can be formed with the prefix "alder-" alongside the suffix "-ste", as in the phrase de aldergrutst "the very biggest".

Verbs
West Frisian verbs inflect for person, number, tense, and mood.

There are only two inflected tenses, present and past. Other tenses are formed using auxiliary and modal verbs.

There are also only two moods, indicative and imperative, with the imperative only being used in the second person.

There are 3 groups of verbs: weak, strong and irregular verbs. Strong verbs are those that change to past tense with ablaut, or a change in the vowel stem. Weak verbs follow one of two paradigms, depending on whether their ending is "-e" or "-je".

Weak -e verbs

1 If necessary a consonant at the end of the stem is doubled to avoid a change of the pronunciation of the preceding syllable.
2 An unvoiced consonant at the end of the stem takes an unvoiced dental suffix; a voiced consonant takes a voiced dental.

Weak -je verbs

Irregular verbs

Hawwe – To Have

Wêze – To Be

Gean – To Go

References

 Popkema, J. 2006. Grammatica Fries. De regels van het Fries. Utrecht: Het Spectrum.
 Munske, Horst Haider. 2001. Handbuch des Friesischen (Handbook of Frisian Studies). Tübingen: Niemeyer. xiv+845pp.
 Tiersma, Pieter Meijes. 1999. Frisian Reference Grammar. Fryske Akademy. 162pp.
 Hoekstra, Jarich Freark. 1997. The syntax of infinitives in Frisian. Leeuwarden: Fryske Akademy. v+169pp. (zugl.: Groningen, Univ., Diss., 1997).
 Tiersma, P.M. 1985. Frisian Reference Grammar. Dordrecht: Foris Publications. xii+157pp.
 de Boer, B. 1950. Studie over het Dialect van Hindeloopen. Assen: Van Gorcum. 196pp.
 Sipma, Pieter. 1913. Phonology & grammar of modern West Frisian; with phonetic texts and glossary. Oxford University Press. 194pp.

West Frisian language
North Sea Germanic grammars